Kunjukrishnan Nadar Memorial Government Arts and Science College, is a general degree college located in Kanjiramkulam, Thiruvananthapuram district, Kerala. It was established in the year 1982. The college is affiliated with Kerala University. This college offers different courses in arts, commerce and science. It is the smallest college in India.

Departments and Courses Offered

The college has five main departments and six sub-departments. The departments are:

Science

Physics
Statistics
Mathematics

Arts and Commerce

Malayalam
English
Hindi
History
Political Science
Economics
Sociology
Commerce

The main courses offered are:

1️⃣ UG Courses

 B.A. Communicative English
 B.A. Economics
 B.A. Sociology
 B.Com.
 B.Sc. Mathematics

2️⃣ PG Courses

 M.A. Sociology
 M.Com.

Accreditation
The college is  recognized by the University Grants Commission (UGC).

References

External links
http://knmgovtcollege.ac.in

Universities and colleges in Thiruvananthapuram district
Educational institutions established in 1982
1982 establishments in Kerala
Arts and Science colleges in Kerala
Colleges affiliated to the University of Kerala